An Giang Coffee (CTCP Cà Phê An Giang) (HST:AGC) is a coffee company in Vietnam. An Giang primarily manufactures and trades coffee, although it has other manufacturing activities and  it operates a logistics network (i.e. warehousing and trucking).  It produces about 60,000 tons of coffee per year, which is about 10% of Vietnam's total coffee production. An Giang exports coffee to over 20 countries, including Japan, Switzerland and Belgium; and it manages its own brand name of coffee, "An Giang Coffee".

Company headquarters are located in Long Thành District of Đồng Nai Province, in the south of Vietnam near Ho Chi Minh City. It is listed on the Hanoi Securities Trading Center.

See also
 Coffee cultivation and production

References

External links
 
 An Giang Coffee JSC at Hanoi Stock Exchange

Coffee companies of Vietnam
Coffee brands
Vietnamese brands
Vietnamese companies established in 2004
Companies listed on the Hanoi Stock Exchange
Đồng Nai province
Food and drink companies established in 2004